Armand Darnauguilhem (9 February 1926 – 9 May 1967) was a French racing cyclist. He rode in the 1950 Tour de France.

References

1926 births
1967 deaths
French male cyclists
Place of birth missing